Fak Tha is a district (amphoe) of Uttaradit province, northern Thailand.

History
The minor district (king amphoe) Fak Tha was established in 1937 as a subordinate of Nam Pat district. On 22 July 1958 it was upgraded to a full district.

Geography
Neighboring districts are (from the east clockwise) Ban Khok and Nam Pat of Uttaradit Province, and Na Muen of Nan province.

The main river of the district is the Pat River, a tributary of the Nan River.

Administration
The district is divided into four sub-districts (tambon), which are further subdivided into 33 villages (muban). Fak Tha is a sub-district municipality (thesaban tambon) which covers parts of tambon Fak Tha and Long Don. There are a further four tambon administrative organizations (TAO).

Places

Education
 Fak Tha Wittaya School
 Anu Ban Fak Tha School
 Rattanaprasitwit Industrall

Temples
 Wat Ban Doen
 Wat Ban Huai Luek
 Wat Ban Lum
 Wat Fak Na
 Wat Huai Sai
 Wat Huai Sun
 Wat Hua Thung
 Wat Kok Tong
 Wat Na Nam
 Wat Na Rai Diao
 Wat Nong Hua Na
 Wat Pho Chai
 Wat Pho Du
 Wat Pho Tia
 Wat Phon That
 Wat Sam Bon
 Wat Wang Kong
 Wat Wang-o

Hospital
 Fak Tha Hospital

References

External links
amphoe.com (Thai)

Fak Tha